The Island, New Jersey may refer to the following places in New Jersey:
The Island section of Hilltop, Jersey City
The Island, Trenton, New Jersey